Home as Found (1838) is a novel written by James Fenimore Cooper. It takes place in the fictional town of Templeton, which is modeled after the Village of Cooperstown. In the novel the Effingham family moves back to Templeton from New York City.

References

1838 American novels
Novels by James Fenimore Cooper
Novels set in New York (state)